Maha Movie is a Free-to-Air, Hindi movies channel owned by DV Media & Entertainment. The channel was launched on June 1, 2014 maha movie is going to rebrand as maha cartoon tv soon

History 
Maha Movie is the third channel launched by DV Group of Companies; the precursor company to Teleone Consumers Product Pvt Ltd.

List of movies 
Luv Kush (1963)
Daanveer Karn (1964)
Om Namah Shivay (1965)
Maa Shakti (1967)
Veer Eklavya (1970)
Aankh Micholi (1972)
Jwaar Bhata (1973)
Ganga Gowri (1973)
Raja Kaka (1974)
Apne Dushman (1975)
Dasavatharam (1976)
Raeeszada (1976)
Ankh Ka Tara (1978)
Hamara Sansar (1978)
Maan Apmaan (1979)
Rajnikanth The Boss (1982)
Mujhe Insaaf Chahiye (1983)
Bhishama (1983)
Jai Shiv Shankar (1985)
Niddar (1986)
Sabse Bada Badshah (1990)
Shakti Tera Naam (1990)
Dharam Ki Jung (1991)
Naseebwala (1992)
Naag Mera Rakshak (1992)
Akhiri Intaqam (1992)
Mawaali Raj (1993)
Prateeksha (1993)
Chicken Mughlai (1993)
Aag Aur Chingari (1994)
Aaj Ka Shaktiman (1994)
Mahanandi (1994)
Aaj Ka Chinna (1994)
Nazar Ke Zamne (1995)
Sirf Tum Hi Tum (1996)
Nazarr (1996)
Mission Mera Maqsad (1998)
Jallad No. 1 (2000)
Chotta Johnny (2001)
Saala Saheb (2001)
Yes Or No (2001)
Tum Jiyo Hazaron Saal (2002)
Baaghi Aurat (2002)
Kiccha (2003)
Ramchandra (2003)
Shikaar - The Musical Thriller (2004)
Kalasi Palya Junction (2004)
Ranga (2004)
Relax (2005)
Mestri (2005)
Barf Ka Toofan (2005)
Mar Mitenge (2006)
Love In Japan (2006)
Kasam Tere Ishq Ki (2006)
Khaki Vardi (2007)
Hukumat Ki Jung (2007)
Tiger Siva (2007)
Gundaraaj (2007)
Ek Aur Jabaria Jodi (2007)
Phir Aaya Deewana (2008)
Navagraha (2008)
Andhi Aur Toofan (2008)
Mr. Medhavi (2008)
Deepavali (2008)
Chanchal (2008)
Bombay Ka Baadshah (2008)
Meri Padosan (2009)
16 Days (2009)
Kahani Choron Ki (2009)
Junction (2009)
Crash Point (2009)
The Hero - Abhimanyu (2009)
Bhai Arjuna (2010)
Mera Iraada (2010)
Ek Aur Ladaku (2010)
Drohi (2010)
Kasam Mardangi Ki (2010)
Kalyug Ka Sathyam (2010)
Sapon Ka Humla (2010)
Hoo (2010)
Puzhal (2010)
Meri Pukar (2010)
Dildaar Ashique (2011)
Mallikarjuna (2011)
Jurassic Shark (2012)
Khoonkhar Hasina (2012)
Big Bad Bugs (2012)
Guruvaram (2012)
Ek Aur Wanted (2012)
Do Janbaaz (2013)
Vijayanagaram (2013)
Operation Duryodhana 2 (2013)
Dhoni VS Sehwag (2013)
Tevar - The Real Story (2013)
Hara (2014)
Murari (2014)
Veeran Muthu Rakku (2014)
Ghar Ek Chambal (2014)
Daring Revenge (2014)
Ek Khiladi Ek Haseena (2014)
Jai Lalitha (2014)
Khel - The Dirty Game (2014)
Kill Them Young (2015)
Welcome God (2015)
Neralu (2015)
The Real Kidnap (2015)
Angry Ganesha (2016)
Demon Hunter (2016)
Kiragoorina Gay Yaligalu (2016)
Monkey Twins (2016)
Nataraja Service (2016)
The Real Policewala (2017)
1930 - A Devil Story (2017)
Red Spring (2017)
Reevolution (2017)
Rakt Charitra (2017)
Sabse Bade Thugg (2017)
Vanavillu (2017)
Do Partner (2017)
Seedhi Takkar (2017)
Sweetie Weds NRI (2017)
Prathikshanam (2017)
Na Jaane Kaun (2017)
HBD - Hacked By Devil (2018)
Atone (2019)
Simha Sena (2019)
The Trees Have Red Eyes (2020)

References

Hindi-language television channels in India
Television channels and stations established in 2013
Hindi-language television stations
Television stations in Faizabad
Movie channels in India